Troitsa is a rural locality (a village) in Razdolyevskoye Rural Settlement, Kolchuginsky District, Vladimir Oblast, Russia. The population was 11 as of 2010.

Geography 
Troitsa is located on the Peksha River, 20 km southeast of Kolchugino (the district's administrative centre) by road. Kudryavtsevo is the nearest rural locality.

References 

Rural localities in Kolchuginsky District